UGL may mean:

 UGL (company), Australian engineering company owned by CIMIC Group.
 Underslung grenade launcher
 Unione Generale Del Lavoro, General Labour Union (Italy)
 Gellan tetrasaccharide unsaturated glucuronyl hydrolase, an enzyme
 Unsaturated chondroitin disaccharide hydrolase, an enzyme
 Underground lab